The 1991 All-Ireland Minor Football Championship was the 60th staging of the All-Ireland Minor Football Championship since its establishment by the Gaelic Athletic Association in 1929.

Meath entered the championship as the defending champions, however, they were defeated by Dublin in a Leinster first round replay.

The All-Ireland final was played on 15 September 1991 between Cork and Mayo, in what was their first meeting in a final in six years. Cork won the match by 1-09 to 1-07 to claim their eighth championship title overall and their first title since 1981.

Cork's Podsie O'Mahony was the championship's top scorer with 0-27.

Results

Connacht Minor Football Championship

Connacht first round

Connacht semi-finals

Connacht final

Leinster Minor Football Championship

Leinster first round

Leinster quarter-finals

Leinster semi-finals

Leinster final

Munster Minor Football Championship

Munster first round

Munster semi-finals

Munster final

Ulster Minor Football Championship

Ulster preliminary round

Ulster quarter-finals

Ulster semi-finals

Ulster final

All-Ireland Minor Football Championship

All-Ireland semi-finals

All-Ireland final

References

1991
All-Ireland Minor Football Championship